Live at Semper Opera is a live album by French jazz fusion artist Jean-Luc Ponty, released in 2002.

Track listing 
All songs by Jean-Luc Ponty unless otherwise noted.
 "Imaginary Voyage - Infinite Pursuit" – 11:16
 "Jig" – 9:39
 "Forever Together" – 6:18
 "No Absolute Time" – 10:48
 "Mirage" – 3:57
 "Enigmatic Ocean, Pts. 1 & 2" – 10:26
 "Band Introduction" – 2:10
 "Mouna Bowa" (Ponty, Guy N'Sangue) – 8:44
 "Caracas" – 8:56

Personnel
Jean-Luc Ponty – violin, keyboards, Synclavier, electronic percussion, electronic drums, effects
William Lecomte – piano
Guy N'Sangue – bass
Thierry Arpino – drums
Moustapha Cisse – percussion

References

Jean-Luc Ponty live albums
2002 live albums